Adi Shankara, a Hindu philosopher of the Advaita Vedanta school, composed a number of commentarial works. Due to his later influence, a large body of works which are central to the Advaita Vedanta interpretation of the Prasthanatrayi—the canonical texts consisting of the Upanishads, the Bhagavad Gita and the Brahma Sutras are also attributed to him. While his own works mainly consist of commentaries, the later works summarize various doctrines of the Advaita Vedanta tradition, including doctrines diverging from Adi Shankara.

Overview

Methodology
Shankara formulates the doctrine of Advaita Vedanta by validating his arguments on the basis of quotations from the Vedas and other Hindu scriptures.

A large portion of his works is polemical in nature. He directs his polemics mostly against the Sankhya, Bauddha, Jaina, Vaisheshika and other non-vedantic Hindu philosophies.

Authorship
Other scholars  say that Shankaracharya's authorship of the commentaries on the Brahman Sutra, the ten principal Upanishads as well as the Bhagavad Gita are beyond doubt.

Classification
Traditionally, his works are classified under
 , commentary
 , philosophical treatise
 Stotra, devotional hymn

The commentaries serve to provide a consistent interpretation of the scriptural texts from the perspective of Advaita Vedanta. The philosophical treatises provide various methodologies to the student to understand the doctrine. The devotional hymns are rich in poetry and piety, serving to highlight the helplessness of the devotee and the glory of the deity. A partial list of his works is given below.

Adi Shankara wrote  (commentaries) on

 (Rigveda)
 (Śukla Yajurveda)

 (samaveda)
 (samaveda)

 (Atharvaveda)
 (Atharvaveda)
 (Mahabhārata)
 (Mahabhārata)
 (Mahabhārata)

The following treatises are written by, or attributed to, Adi Shankara:
 (Crest-Jewel of Wisdom)
 (A thousand teachings)

 (Dṛg-Dṛśya-Viveka)

 (The Gem-Garland of Questions and Answers)Satasloki|Śataśloki

 see - http://www.easterntradition.org/article/Bibliographic%20Guide%20-%20Sankaracarya's%20Original%20Works.pdf
Also https://archive.org/details/PRAKARANADVADASHI/page/2/mode/1up

Many hymns on Shiva, Vishnu, Devi, Ganesha and Subrahmanya are attributed to Adi Shankara:

, also known as 

 Subramanya Bhujangam
 Kashi Panchakam
 Suvarnamala
 Mahishasura Mardini stotram
 Meenakshi Pancha Ratnam
 Nirvana Shatakam also known as Atma Shatakam
 Sabarigiri Ashtakam

Editions
A lot of editions of the works of Adi Shankara are available. A few of them are given below:

Collections of Works
Sri Sankara Granthavali - Complete Works of Sri Sankaracarya in the original Sanskrit, v. 1-10, revised ed., Samata Books, Madras, 1998. (Originally published from Sri Vani Vilas Press, Srirangam, 1910ff., under the direction of the Sringeri matha.)
Sankaracaryera Granthamala, v. 1-4, Basumati Sahitya Mandira, Calcutta, 1995. (complete works with Bengali translation and commentary)
Upanishad-bhashya-sangraha, Mahesanusandhana Samsthanam, Mt. Abu, 1979-1986. Sankara's bhashyas on the Katha, Mandukya, Taittiriya, Chandogya and Brihadaranyaka Upanishad, with Anandagiri's Tīkas and other sub-commentaries.
Prakarana-dvadasi, Mahesanusandhana Samsthanam, Mt. Abu, 1981. A collection of twelve prakarana granthas, with commentaries.
A Bouquet of Nondual Texts, by Adi Sankara, Translated by Dr. H. Ramamoorthy and Nome, Society of Abidance in Truth, 2006. A collection of eight texts. This volume contains the Sanskrit original, transliteration, word-for-word meaning and alternative meanings, and complete English verses.
Svatmanirupanam: The True Definition of One's Own Self, Translated by Dr. H. Ramamoorthy and Nome, Society of Abidance in Truth, 2002
Nirguna Manasa Puja: Worship of the Attributeless One in the Mind, Translated by Dr. H. Ramamoorthy and Nome, Society of Abidance in Truth, 1993
Hastamalakiyam: A Fruit in the Hand or A Work by Hastamalaka, Translated by Dr. H. Ramamoorthy and Nome, Society of Abidance in Truth, 2017

Brahmasutra Bhashya
Edited with Marathi translation, by Kasinath Sastri Lele, Srikrishna Mudranalaya, Wai, 1908.
Edited with vaiyasika-nyayamala of Bharatitirtha, and Marathi commentary, by Vishnu Vaman Bapat Sastri, Pune, 1923.
Selections translated into English, by S. K. Belvalkar, Poona Oriental Series no. 13, Bilvakunja, Pune, 1938.
Edited with Adhikarana-ratnamala of Bharatitirtha, Sri Venkatesvara Mudranalaya, Bombay, 1944.
Translated into English, by V. M. Apte, Popular Book Depot, Bombay, 1960.
Translated into English, by George Thibaut, Dover, New York, 1962. (reprint of Clarendon Press editions of The Sacred Books of the East v.34, 38)
Sri Sankaracarya Granthavali, no. 3, 1964.
Translated into English, by Swami Gambhirananda, Advaita Ashrama, Kolkata, 1965.
Translated into German, by Paul Deussen, G. Olms, Hildesheim, 1966.

Bhagavadgita Bhashya
Critically edited by Dinkar Vishnu Gokhale, Oriental Book Agency, Pune, 1931.
Edited with Anandagiri's Tika, by Kasinath Sastri Agashe, Anandasrama, Pune, 1970.
Alladi Mahadeva Sastri, The Bhagavad Gita : with the commentary of Sri Sankaracharya, Samata Books, Madras, 1977.
A. G. Krishna Warrier, Srimad Bhagavad Gita Bhashya of Sri Sankaracarya, Ramakrishna Math, Madras, 1983.
Translated into English, by Swami Gambhirananda, Advaita Ashrama, Kolkata, 1984.
Trevor Leggett, Realization of the Supreme Self : the Bhagavad Gita Yogas, (translation of Sankara's commentary), Kegan Paul International, London, 1995.

Upadeshasahasri
Sitarama Mahadeva Phadke, Sankaracaryakrta Upadesashasri, Rasikaranjana Grantha Prasaraka Mandali, Pune, 1911. (with Marathi translation)
Paul Hacker, Unterweisung in der All-Einheits-Lehre der Inder: Gadyaprabandha, (German translation of and notes on the Prose book of the upadeSasAhasrI) L. Röhrscheid, Bonn, 1949.

Vivekachudamani
Edited with English translation, by Mohini Chatterjee, Theosophical Publishing House, Madras, 1947.
Ernest Wood, The Pinnacle of Indian Thought, Theosophical Publishing House, Wheaton (Illinois), 1967. (English translation)
Swami Prabhavananda and Christopher Isherwood, Shankara's Crest-jewel of Discrimination, with A Garland of Questions and Answers, Vedanta Press, California, 1971.
Sri Sankara's Vivekachudamani with an English translation of the Sanskrit Commentary of Sri Chandrashekhara Bharati of Sringeri. Translated by P. Sankaranarayanan. Bharatiya Vidya Bhavan. 1999

Panchikarana
Edited with Sureshvara's varttika and varttikabharana of Abhinavanarayanendra Sarasvati (17th century), Sri Vani Vilas Press, Srirangam, 1970.
Edited with Gujarati translation and notes, Sri Harihara Pustakalya, Surat, 1970.

See also
Adi Shankara
Advaita Vedanta
Smartism
Hindu scriptures
Atma Shatakam

Notes

References

Sources

  Some editions spell the author Isayeva.

External links
 Complete Works of Sri Shankaracharya - 20 Volumes - 1910 Edition as scanned PDF files at Archive.org
 Complete Works of Shankaracharya

Hindu texts
Bibliographies by writer
Bibliographies of Indian writers
Sanskrit texts
Religious bibliographies
Advaita Vedanta
Adi Shankara